Güvercin is a village in the Batman District of Batman Province in Turkey. The village is populated by Kurds of the Receban tribe and had a population of 245 in 2021.

References 

Villages in Batman District
Kurdish settlements in Batman Province